In Christian scribal practice, nomina sacra (singular: nomen sacrum from Latin sacred name) is the abbreviation of several frequently occurring divine names or titles, especially in Greek manuscripts of the Bible. A nomen sacrum consists of two or more letters from the original word spanned by an overline.

Biblical scholar and textual critic Bruce M. Metzger lists 15 such words treated as nomina sacra from Greek papyri: the Greek counterparts of God, Lord, Jesus, Christ, Son, Spirit, David, Cross, Mother, Father, Israel, Savior, Man, Jerusalem, and Heaven. These nomina sacra are all found in Greek manuscripts of the 3rd century and earlier, except Mother, which appears in the 4th. All 15 occur in Greek manuscripts later than the 4th century.

Nomina sacra also occur in some form in Latin, Coptic, Armenian (indicated by the pativ), Gothic, Old Nubian, and Cyrillic (indicated by the titlo).

Origin and development

Nomina sacra are consistently observed in even the earliest extant Christian writings, along with the codex form rather than the roll, implying that when these were written, in approximately the second century, the practice had already been established for some time. However, it is not known precisely when and how the nomina sacra first arose.

The initial system of nomina sacra apparently consisted of just four or five words, called nomina divina: the Greek words for Jesus, Christ, Lord, God, and possibly Spirit. The practice quickly expanded to a number of other words regarded as sacred.

In the system of nomina sacra that came to prevail, abbreviation is by contraction, meaning that the first and last letter (at least) of each word are used. Contraction, however, offered the practical advantage of indicating the case of the abbreviated noun.

It is evident that the use of nomina sacra was an act of reverence rather than a purely practical space-saving device, as they were employed even where well-established abbreviations of far more frequent words such as and were avoided, and the nomen sacrum itself was written with generous spacing. Furthermore, early scribes often distinguished between mundane and sacred occurrences of the same word, e.g. a spirit vs. the Spirit, and applied nomina sacra only to the latter (at times necessarily revealing an exegetical choice), although later scribes would mechanically abbreviate all occurrences.

Scholars have advanced a number of theories on the origin of the nomina sacra. In some Greek Scripture manuscripts the Hebrew tetragrammaton (transliterated as YHWH) is found unabbreviated in the Greek text. The Septuagint manuscript Papyrus Oxyrhynchus 1007 even uses an abbreviated form of the tetragrammaton: two Greek zetas with a horizontal line through the middle, imitating two Paleo-Hebrew yodhs (𐤉‬𐤉).

Greek culture also employed a number of ways of abbreviating even proper names, though none in quite the same form as the nomina sacra. Inspiration for the contracted forms (using the first and last letter) has also been seen in Revelation, where Jesus speaks of himself as "the beginning and the end" and "the first and the last" as well "the Alpha and the Omega".

Cilliers Breytenbach and Christiane Zimmermann report that by the end of the 2nd century nomina sacra occur even in Christian tomb inscriptions in Greek in Lycaonia (modern central Turkey).

List of Greek nomina sacra

New Testament Greek manuscripts containing nomina sacra (before 300 CE)

See also 
 Christogram
 Staurogram

References

Further reading 

 Don C. Barker, "P.Lond.Lit. 207 and the origin of the nomina sacra: a tentative proposal", Studia Humaniora Tartuensia 8.A.2, 2007, 1–14.
 Philip Comfort, Encountering the Manuscripts: An Introduction to New Testament Paleography and Textual Criticism, Broadman & Holman Publishers, 2005, pp. 199–253.
 A.H.R.E. Paap, Nomina Sacra in the Greek Papyri of the First Five Centuries, Papyrologica Lugduno-Batava VIII (Leiden 1959).
 Ludwig Traube. Nomina Sacra. Versuch einer Geschichte der christlichen Kürzung, Munich 1907.

Abbreviations
Christian symbols
Early Christian inscriptions
Christian terminology
Latin words and phrases